Area codes 713, 281, 832, and 346 are telephone area codes in the North American Numbering Plan (NANP) forming an overlay complex for Houston, Texas and its environs. Area code 713 is one of the original four area codes established for Texas in 1947.

History
When the North American Numbering Plan was established in 1947, Texas was divided into four numbering plan areas (NPAs), roughly outlining four quadrants in the state. Area code 713 was assigned to the southeastern part, from the Sabine River to the Brazos Valley.

On March 19, 1983, the numbering plan area was divided for the first time. The immediate Houston area retained area code 713, while the northern, eastern and western portions became area code 409.

On November 2, 1996, area code 713 was split again, with most of Houston's suburbs switching to area code 281. The dividing line roughly followed Beltway 8. Generally, the majority of Houston itself and most of the suburbs inside the beltway kept area code 713, while 281 served everything outside the beltway.  However, area code 713 was retained by all cellphone customers in the Houston area.

Although this was intended as a long-term solution, the rapid growth in demand for telephone services from the proliferation of pagers and cell phones required additional numbering resources within two years in both numbering plan areas. On January 16, 1999, the 713/281 boundary was removed, creating an overlay for the combined area, while simultaneously adding a third area code to the entire region, area code 832. As a result, ten-digit dialing became required for all calls in the Houston area.

On May 9, 2013, the Public Utility Commission of Texas announced the addition of yet another code, area code 346, to the Houston overlay as of July 1, 2014. This had the effect of allocating over 31 million telephone numbers to a service territory of eight million people. Exhaust projections of 2022 forecast that the Houston area will not need a fifth area code until about 2026.

Service area
Counties served by these area codes:

Harris (shared with 936)
Brazoria (shared with 979)
Chambers (shared with 409)
Fort Bend (shared with 979)
Galveston (shared with 409)
Liberty (shared with 936)
Montgomery (shared with 979 and 936)
Waller (shared with 979 and 936)

Towns and cities served by these area codes:

Addicks
Alvin
Arcola
Bacliff
Baytown
Bellaire
Brookshire
Brookside Village
Bunker Hill Village
Channelview
Cleveland
Clodine
Conroe
Crosby
Cypress
Deer Park
El Lago
Dickinson
Fresno
Friendswood
Fulshear
Galena Park
Hedwig Village
Highlands
Hilshire Village
Hitchcock
Hockley
Houston
Huffman
Humble
Hunters Creek Village
Iowa Colony
Jacinto City
Jersey Village
Katy
Kemah
Kingwood
Klein
La Marque
La Porte
League City
Liverpool
Magnolia
Manvel
Meadows Place
Missouri City
Mont Belvieu
Montgomery
Nassau Bay
New Caney
Pasadena
Pattison
Pearland
Pinehurst
Piney Point Village
Plum Grove
Porter
Richmond
Romayor
Rosenberg
Rosharon
Rye
Santa Fe
Seabrook
Simonton
South Houston
Splendora
Spring
Spring Valley Village
Stafford
Sugar Land
Taylor Lake Village
Texas City
The Woodlands
Thompsons
Tomball
Webster
West University Place

See also

List of Texas area codes

References

Further reading

External links

Telecommunications-related introductions in 1947
Telecommunications-related introductions in 1996
Telecommunications-related introductions in 1999
Telecommunications-related introductions in 2014
281
281
Houston